The Cernavodă culture, ca. 4000–3200 BC, was a late Copper Age archaeological culture. It was along the lower Eastern Bug River and Danube and along the coast of the Black Sea and somewhat inland, generally in present-day Romania and Bulgaria. It is named after the Romanian town of Cernavodă.

It is a successor to and occupies much the same area as the earlier Karanovo culture and Gumelnița culture, for which a destruction horizon seems to be evident. It is part of the "Balkan-Danubian complex" that stretches up the entire length of the river and into northern Germany via the Elbe and the Baden culture; its northeastern portion is thought to be ancestral to the Usatove culture.

It is characterized by defensive hilltop settlements. The pottery shares traits with that found further east, in the Sredny Stog culture on the south-west Eurasian steppe; burials similarly bear a resemblance to those further east.

It has been theorized that Cernadova culture, together with the Sredny Stog culture, was the source of Anatolian languages and introduced them to Anatolia through the Balkans after Anatolian split from the Proto-Indo-Anatolian language, which some linguists and archaeologists place in the area of the Sredny Stog culture.

See also 
 Bronze Age in Romania
 Coțofeni culture
 Basarabi culture
 Otomani culture
 Pecica culture
 Wietenberg culture
 Hamangia culture
 Prehistory of Transylvania
 Prehistoric Romania

Notes

References 
 
 J. P. Mallory, "Cernavoda Culture", Encyclopedia of Indo-European Culture, Fitzroy Dearborn, 1997.

External links
Cernavoda I Culture

Indo-European archaeological cultures
Chalcolithic cultures of Europe
Archaeological cultures of Southeastern Europe
Archaeological cultures of Eastern Europe
Archaeological cultures in Bulgaria
Archaeological cultures in Moldova
Archaeological cultures in Romania
Archaeological cultures in Ukraine
4th millennium BC